The International Franchise Association (IFA) is a trade group focused on government and public relations efforts for the franchise industry. The association publishes data on franchise activity through a partnership with the U.S. Census Bureau and has litigated on behalf of its members in cases that have reached the U.S. Supreme Court.

History 
IFA was originally founded in Chicago in 1961 by Dunkin' Donuts founder Bill Rosenberg and other business owners.

Lobbying activities 
IFA lobbies in local, state and federal workforce issues such as minimum wage increases, employee classifications and health care legislation. In 2015, the IFA filed suit against the city of Seattle to combat the city's planned minimum wage increase. The case proceeded to the US Supreme Court, which ruled in favor of Seattle.

The Center for Media and Democracy consider IFA to be a source of pro-business lobbying activity on behalf of other groups such as ALEC and the Koch Brothers.

Membership 
IFA claims a membership of 1,400 brands, and states that its members represent 2.5% of the U.S. GDP

References 

501(c)(6) nonprofit organizations
Lobbying firms based in Washington, D.C.
1961 establishments